The 2007 Pitch and putt European Teams Championship held in Chia (Italy) was organized by the Federazione Italiana Pitch and Putt and promoted by the European Pitch and Putt Association (EPPA), with 10 teams in competition. Ireland won their fifth title.

Teams

Qualifying round

Final Rounds

Final standings

See also 
 European Pitch and putt Championship

External links 
 European Pitch and Putt Championship 

Pitch and putt competitions